Level 10 is an international heavy metal supergroup formed in 2012 by vocalist Russell Allen and bassist/producer Mat Sinner.

Allen and Sinner, wanting to work together, have been united for the new project of the President of Frontiers, Serafino Perugino. The final lineup for the album, including drummer Randy Black and guitar player Alex Beyrodt of Primal Fear, Roland Grapow of Masterplan and Alessandro Del Vecchio (Hardline, Voodoo Circle) on keyboards.

On January 23, 2015, Chapter One, their first and only album, was released.

Discography 
 2015 – Chapter One

Line-up 

 Russell Allen – vocals (2012–present)
 Mat Sinner – bass (2012–present)
 Randy Black – drums (2013–present)
 Alex Beyrodt – guitar (2013–present)
 Roland Grapow – guitar (2014–present)
 Alessandro Del Vecchio – keyboards (2014–present)

References 

Heavy metal supergroups
Musical groups established in 2012
Frontiers Records artists